Ratsifa is a surname, notably in Madagascar, and among the Malagasy people. Notable people with the surname include:

Bako Ratsifa (born 1964), Malagasy swimmer, sister of Vola
Vola Hanta Ratsifa Andrihamanana (born 1970), Malagasy swimmer

Malagasy-language surnames